Leena Chandavarkar (born 29 August 1950) is an Indian former actress who appeared in Bollywood movies as a leading actress and now appears in reality shows. She was an actress during the late 60s and early 70s. She played leading heroine opposite almost all superstars during that era and was frequently paired opposite Rajesh Khanna, Dharmendra, Jeetendra, Sanjeev Kumar, Vinod Khanna, Dilip Kumar, Sunil Dutt and Raaj Kumar.

Biography 
Leena Chandavarkar was born to a Konkani Marathi speaking Army officer Sreenath Chandavarkar at Dharwad in Karnataka in 1950. She was supposed to debut with the film Maseeha (1967) opposite Sunil Dutt costarring Raaj Kumar and Mumtaz too under the direction of Sunil Dutt himself. The film got shelved and she made her debut under the direction of Sunil Dutt with the movie Man ka Meet in 1968. The movie was a hit and she became an overnight star. She was one of the topmost heroines in early 70s alongside Hema Malini and Mumtaz.  She had an elder brother Anil Chandavarkar who married director Atmaram's daughter and has a daughter from the marriage. He committed suicide in 1985. She quit Bollywood after marriage with singing legend Kishore Kumar only to return for two movies later.

Career 
Chandavarkar came into the limelight after finishing as one of the runners-up for the Fresh Face Competition organized across the country by Filmfare. Initially, she worked in advertisements but eventually ventured into films. She made her debut in Man Ka Meet for Sunil Dutt, and it was his wife Nargis who groomed her to be an actress. Between 1969 and 1979, Leena acted in many films. She was cast opposite many of popular heroes of that era. She gave one of her best performances in Mehboob Ki Mehndi with Rajesh Khanna in 1971.

Bairaag, in 1976, is another example where she acted with Dilip Kumar and an ensemble star cast of Saira Bano, Prem Chopra and Helen.

She appeared as a guest judge for the first 2 episodes of "K for Kishore", a new reality TV singing show launched by Sony TV during December 2007. She is now appearing for the reality shows. She also penned some songs for Amit Kumar and Rajesh Bambal for a music album.

Personal life 
She had an arranged marriage to her first husband, Siddharth Bandodkar, who came from a prominent Goan political family. He died from an accidental gunshot wound, a few days into the marriage, leaving Leena a widow at age 25. A few years later, she married singing legend Kishore Kumar. Her father initially objected because Kumar had been married three times already, and was more than 20 years older than her, but he soon came around and welcomed Kumar into the family. She has a son with Kishore Kumar named Sumit Ganguly. Kishore died in 1987, leaving Leena once again a widow at age 37. She lives with her son Sumeet, her step-son Amit Kumar, and his wife.

Filmography

References

External links 
 
 Leena Chandavarkar: The innocent shrew
 Leena Chandavarkar and Her Movies

Indian film actresses
Living people
Konkani people
People from Dharwad
1950 births